Chammes is a former commune in the Mayenne department in north-western France. On 1 January 2016, it was merged into the new commune of Sainte-Suzanne-et-Chammes.

See also
Communes of Mayenne

References

Former communes of Mayenne